A motherboard is the main printed circuit board in a computer.

Motherboard may also refer to:
Motherboard cache, the storage component of a motherboard
Motherboard form factor, the specifications of a motherboard
Motherboard (Cyberchase), a character from Cyberchase
Motherboard (website), an online tech news publication by Vice Media
"Motherboard" (Daft Punk song), 2013 song in album Random Access Memories
Motherboard Monitor, a software program for Windows